Gazzetta di Milano may refer to one of the following gazettes published in Milan in different times and by different publishers:

 Gazzetta di Milano (1769-1782), published as a continuation of the newspaper Milano by the publisher Malatesta
 Il Corriere di Gabinetto - Gazzetta di Milano, published by the publisher Pirola. From 21 May 1796 to 28 December 1797 it had the only title Gazzetta di Milano
 Gazzetta di Milano (1816-1875), published from 1816 to 1875